Al Buraiqeh District is a district of the Aden Governorate, Yemen. As of 2003, the district had a population of 62,405 inhabitants.

References

Districts of Aden Governorate
Aden Governorate